John Bouch Pattinson (1886 – 29 November 1918) was an English professional footballer who played as a winger.

Whilst he did not score during his first spell at Doncaster Rovers, he scored 12 League and Cup goals in his second period.

References

1886 births
1918 deaths
Footballers from Worksop
English footballers
Association football wingers
Gainsborough Trinity F.C. players
Sheffield United F.C. players
Grimsby Town F.C. players
Doncaster Rovers F.C. players
Manchester City F.C. players
Rotherham County F.C. players
Midland Football League players
English Football League players
Deaths from the Spanish flu pandemic in the United Kingdom